El tesoro de Morgan (English: "The Treasure of Morgan") is a 1974 Mexican adventure film directed by Zacarías Gómez Urquiza and starring Pilar Bayona and Lorena Velázquez.

It was filmed in Colombia and Panama.

Plot
A young woman (Pilar Bayona) runs away from school to fulfill her deceased father's wish to find the treasure of the pirate Morgan. But a woman (Lorena Velázquez) and her henchmen will cause her trouble.

Cast
Pilar Bayona as Magda Rossini
Agustín Martínez Solares as Julián Llaguno
Lorena Velázquez as Dalia
Anita Villalaz as Doña Lucero
Eduardo Sampson as Private Detective "Chelo" Gómez
John Bell
Blanquita Casanova as Mother Superior
José García de la Torre
Enrique Jaén as Abusive Husband
Lincoln Macleod as Black Hunk
Armando Roblan as Hotel Manager
Armando Sotomayor as Major's Secretary
Mireya Uribe as Pregnant Woman
Alberto Vergara

References

External links

1974 films
1970s adventure films
Films directed by Zacarías Gómez Urquiza
Films shot in Colombia
Films shot in Panama
Mexican adventure films
1970s Spanish-language films
1970s Mexican films